Lindsay Davenport and Lisa Raymond were the defending champions, but Raymond did not compete this year. Davenport teamed up with Chanda Rubin and lost in quarterfinals to tournament winners Elena Bovina and Justine Henin.

Bovina and Henin won the title by defeating Jelena Dokic and Nadia Petrova 6–2, 7–6(7–2) in the final. It was the 6th title for Bovina and the 2nd title for Henin in their respective doubles careers.

This tournament saw an unusual event, as all seeded pairs were eliminated in their first match.

Seeds

Draw

Draw

Qualifying

Qualifying seeds

Qualifiers
  Evgenia Kulikovskaya /  Tatiana Perebiynis

Qualifying draw

References
 Official results archive (ITF)
 Official results archive (WTA)

2002 Doubles
Swisscom Challenge - Doubles